Speed limits in Poland vary depending on the type of road and the type and weight of the vehicle:

The limits shown above apply unless otherwise stated, as road signs may prescribe a lower or a higher speed limit (e.g. limits of 70 km/h or (occasionally) higher can be found on urban dual carriageways).

A higher night speed limit (60 km/h) applied in urban areas from 23:00 to 5:00 until 1 June 2021.

See also
 Highways in Poland

References

Poland
Road transport in Poland